The 1826–27 United States Senate elections were held on various dates in various states. As these U.S. Senate elections were prior to the ratification of the Seventeenth Amendment in 1913, senators were chosen by state legislatures. Senators were elected over a wide range of time throughout 1826 and 1827, and a seat may have been filled months late or remained vacant due to legislative deadlock. In these elections, terms were up for the senators in Class 1.

The majority Jacksonians gained a seat in the United States Senate. Senators who called themselves "Anti-Jacksonian" or "National Republicans" were also called "Adams" or "Adams Men."

Results summary 
Senate party division, 20th Congress (1827–1829)

 Majority party: Jacksonian (27)
 Minority party: Anti-Jacksonian (20–21)
 Other parties: (0)
 Total seats: 48

Change in composition

Before the elections 
At the beginning of 1826.

Result of the regular elections

Result of the special elections 
Before the March 4, 1827 beginning of the new Congress.

Race summaries

Special elections during the 19th Congress 
In these special elections, the winners were seated during 1826 or before March 4, 1827; ordered by election date.

Races leading to the 20th Congress 

In these regular elections, the winner was seated on March 4, 1827; ordered by state.

All of the elections involved the Class 1 seats.

Elections during the 20th Congress 
In this election, the winner was seated in 1827 after the new Congress began on March 4.

Alabama (special)

Connecticut

Delaware 

Delaware had two elections: A special for the class 2 seat and a regular election for the class 1 seat.  The elections flipped both seats from Anti-Jacksonian to Jacksonian.

Delaware (special) 

Anti-Jacksonian senator Nicholas Van Dyke died May 21, 1826 and Anti-Jacksonian Daniel Rodney was appointed to continue the class 2 term (ending March 3, 1829) until a special election.

Jacksonian Henry M. Ridgely was elected January 12, 1827.

Delaware (regular) 

Anti-Jacksonian Thomas Clayton had served since winning an 1824 special election. It is unknown if Clayton was a candidate for re-election in 1827, but that election was won by Jacksonian Louis McLane.

Indiana

Maine

Maryland

Maryland (special) 

Ezekiel F. Chambers won election over Philip Reed by a margin of 18.07%, or 15 votes, for the Class 3 seat.

Maryland (regular) 

Samuel Smith won election by a margin of 87.95%, or 73 votes, for the Class 1 seat.

Massachusetts

Massachusetts (special, class 2)

Massachusetts (regular)

Massachusetts (special, class 1)

Mississippi 

Jacksonian interim appointee Powhatan Ellis had served in the class 1 seat since 1825 for the term ending March 3, 1827.

He faced a special election to finish the term and a regular election to the next term.

Mississippi (special) 

Jacksonian Thomas Buck Reed was elected January 27, 1826 to finish the term, but not to the next full term.

Mississippi (regular) 

Jacksonian interim appointee Powhatan Ellis was elected sometime (date unknown) to the next term, and would go on to serve until 1832.

Missouri

New Jersey

New Jersey (regular)

New Jersey (special)

New York

Ohio

Pennsylvania

Rhode Island

South Carolina (special)

Tennessee

Vermont

Virginia

See also 
 1826 United States elections
 1826–27 United States House of Representatives elections
 19th United States Congress
 20th United States Congress

Notes

References 

 Party Division in the Senate, 1789-Present, via Senate.gov